The 2014–15 TSV 1860 Munich season happened between 4 August 2014 and 2 June 2015.

Season review

August
Matchday one happened on 4 August 2014 against 1. FC Kaiserslautern. Kaiserslautern won the match 3–2. Rubin Okotie scored two goals for 1860 Munich. Kaiserslautern got two goals from Srđan Lakić, including one from the penalty mark, and a goal from Philipp Hofmann. Tobias Sippel was sent-off during the match. 1860 Munich finished matchday one in 15th place. Matchday two happened on 10 August 2014 against RB Leipzig. Leipzig won the match 3–0 with goals from Yussuf Poulsen, Matthias Morys, and Denis Thomalla. 1860 Munich finished matchday two in 17th place. On 17 August 2014, 1860 Munich faced Holstein Kiel in the first round of the German Cup. 1860 Munich won the match 2–1. Rubin Okotie scored two goals for 1860 Munich, including one from the penalty mark. Tim Siedschlag scored for Holstein Kiel. Matchday three happened on 22 August 2014 against 1. FC Heidenheim. The match finished in a 2–2 draw. Rubin Okotie and Leonardo scored for 1860 Munich. Florian Niederlechner and 
Sebastian Griesbeck scored for Heidenheim. Smail Morabit was sent-off during the match. 1860 Munich finished matchday three in 17th place. Matchday four happened on 31 August 2014 against SV Darmstadt 98. The match finished in a 1–1 draw. Rubin Okotie scored for 1860 Munich and Dominik Stroh-Engel scored for Darmstadt. 1860 Munich finished matchday four in 16th place.

September
Matchday five happened on 14 September 2014 against FC St. Pauli. 1860 Munich won the match 2–1. Leonardo and Yannick Stark scored for 1860 Munich. John Verhoek scored for St. Pauli. 1860 Munich finished matchday five in 11th place. Matchday six happened on 20 September 2014 against FC Ingolstadt 04. The match finished in a 1–1 draw. Rubin Okotie scored for 1860 Munich and Pascal Groß scored for Ingolstadt. 1860 Munich finished matchday six in 12th place. Matchday seven happened on 23 September 2014 against SV Sandhausen. Sandhausen won the match 1–0 with a goal from Andrew Wooten. Lukas Kübler was sent-off during the match. 1860 Munich finished matchday seven in 13th place. Matchday eight happened on 26 September 2014 against Greuther Fürth. 1860 Munich won 2–0 with goals from Rubin Okotie and Ilie Sánchez. 1860 Munich finished matchday eight in 12th place.

October
Matchday nine happened on 3 October 2014 against VfR Aalen. Aalen won 2–0 with goals from Fabian Weiß and Arne Feick. 1860 Munich finished matchday nine in 15th place. Matchday 10 happened on 19 October 2014 against Erzgebirge Aue. Erzgebirge Aue won the match 4–1. Valdet Rama scored for 1860 Munich. René Klingbeil, Arvydas Novikovas, Romario Kortzorg, and Rico Benatelli scored for Erzgebirge Aue. 1860 Munich finished matchday 10 in 17th place. Matchday 11 happened on 26 October 2014 against Eintracht Braunschweig. Eintracht Braunschweig won the match 2–1. Christopher Schindler scored for 2860 Munich. Hendrick Zuck and Raffael Korte scored for Eintracht Braunschweig. 1860 Munich finished matchday 11 in 18th place (last). 1860 Munich faced SC Freiburg in the second round of the German Cup on 29 October 2014. Valdet Rama and Rubin Okotie scored for 1860 Munich. Freiburg got three goals from Admir Mehmedi, a goal from Sebastian Freis, and a goal from Jonathan Schmid.

November
Matchday 12 happened on 2 November 2014 against VfL Bochum. 1860 Munich won 3–0 with two goals from Rubin Okotie and a goal from Daniel Adlung. 1860 Munich finished matchday 12 in 14th place. Matchday 13 happened on 10 November 2014 against Fortuna Düsseldorf. Fortuna Düsseldorf won 1–0 with a goal from Bruno Soares. 1860 Munich finished matchday 13 in 15th place. Matchday 14 happened on 22 November 2014 against Union Berlin. 1860 Munich won the match 4–1. 1860 Munich won the match 4–1. 1860 Munich got two goals from Rubin Okotie and a goal from Daniel Adlung, and a goal from Valdet Rama. Sebastian Polter scored for Union Berlin. 1860 Munich finished matchday 14 in 12th place. Matchday 15 happened on 30 November 2014 against FSV Frankfurt. Frankfurt won the match 2–0 with goals from Zlatko Dedić and Mario Engels. 1860 Munich finished matchday 15 in 15th place.

December to February
Matchday 16 happened on 8 December 2014 against 1. FC Nürnberg. Nürnberg won the match 2–1. 1860 Munich got their goal from an own goal by Jürgen Mössmer. Alessandro Schöpf and Jakub Sylvestr. Martin Angha was sent-off during the match. 1860 Munich finished matchday 16 in 16th place. Matchday 17 happened on 13 December 2014 against Karlsruher SC.  Karlsruhe won the match 3–2. Maximilian Wittek and Rubin Okotie scored for 1860 Munich. Karlsruhe got two goals from Rouwen Hennings and a goal from Hiroki Yamada. 1860 Munich finished matchday 17 in 16th place. Matchday 18 happened on 17 December 2014 against Kaiserslautern. The match finished in a 1–1 draw. Yannick Stark scored for 1860 Munich and Markus Karl scored for Kaiserslautern. 1860 Munich finished matchday 18 in 16th place. Matchday 19 happened on 22 December 2014 against Leipzig. The match finished in a 1–1 draw. Rubin Okotie scored for 1860 Munich and Yussuf Poulsen scored for Leipzig. 1860 Munich finished matchday 19 in 15th place. Matchday 20 happened on 9 February 2015 against Heidenheim. Heidenheim won the match 2–1. Rubin Okotie scored for 1860 Munich. Tim Göhlert and Florian Niederlechner scored for Heidenheim. Ilie Sánchez was sent-off during the match. 1860 Munich finished matchday 20 in 16th place. Matchday 21 happened on 15 February 2015 against Darmstadt. The match finished in a 1–1 draw. Jannik Bandowski scored for 1860 Munich and Leon Balogun scored for Darmstadt. 1860 Munich finished matchday 21 in 16th place. Matchday 22 happened on 21 February 2015 against St. Pauli. 1860 Munich won the match 2–1. 1860 Munich got an own goal from Sören Gonther and a goal from Marius Wolf. Christopher Nöthe scored for St. Pauli. 1860 Munich finished matchday 22 in 15th place.

March
Matchday 23 happened on 2 March 2015 against Ingolstadt. The match finished in a 1–1 draw. Jannik Bandowski scored for 1860 Munich and Danilo scored for Ingolstadt. 1860 Munich finished matchday 23 in 15th place. Matchday 24 happened on 8 March 2015 against Sandhausen. Sandhausen won the match 3–2. Gary Kagelmacher scored two goals for 1860 Munich. Andrew Wooten, Manuel Stiefler, and Nicky Adler scored for Sandhausen. 1860 Munich finished matchday 24 in 15th place. Matchday 25 happened on 13 March 2015 against Greuther Fürth. 1860 Munich won the match 3–0 with goals from Krisztian Simon, Korbinian Vollmann, and Daniel Adlung. 1860 Munich finished matchday 25 in 15th place. Matchday 26 happened on 20 March 2015 against Aalen. The match finished in a 1–1 draw. Rodri scored for 1860 Munich and Collin Quaner scored for Aalen. 1860 Munich finished matchday 26 in 15th place.

April
Matchday 27 happened on 5 April 2015 against Erzgebirge Aue. Erzgebirge Aue won the match 1–0 with a goal from Romario Kortzorg. 1860 Munich finished matchday 28 in 15th place. Matchday 28 happened on 11 April 2015 against Eintracht Braunschweig. Eintracht Braunschweig won the match 2–0 with goals from Hendrick Zuck and Jan Hochscheidt. 1860 Munich finished matchday 28 in 15 place. Matchday 29 happened on 18 April 2015 against Bochum. 1860 Munich won the match 2–1. Marius Wolf and Stephan Hain scored for 1860 Munich. Michael Gregoritsch scored for Bochum. 1860 Munich finished matchday 29 in 15th place. Matchday 30 happened on 25 April 2015 against Fortuna Düsseldorf. The match finished in a 1–1 draw. Daniel Adlung scored for 1860 Munich and Michael Liendl scored for Bochum. 1860 Munich finished matchday 30 in 15th place.

May and June
Matchday 31 happened on 3 May 2015 against Union Berlin. Union Berlin won the match 3–0 with two goals from Sebastian Polter and a goal from Damir Kreilach. 1860 Munich finished matchday 31 in 17th place. Matchday 32 happened on 8 May 2015 against Frankfurt. 1860 Munich won the match 1–0 with a goal from Valdet Rama. 1860 Munich finished matchday 32 in 17th place. Matchday 33 happened on 17 May 2015 against Nürnberg. 1860 Munich won the match 2–1. Yannick Stark and Daniel Adlung scored for 1860 Munich. Guillermo Vallori scored for Nürnberg. Javier Pinola was sent-off during the match. 1860 Munich finished matchday 33 in 15th place. Matchday 34 happened on 24 May 2015 against Karlsruhe. Karlsruhe won the match 2–0 with an own goal from Kai Bülow and a goal from Manuel Torres. 1860 Munich finished the season in 16th place. 1860 Munich qualified for the relegation playoff. The first leg was played on 29 May 2015 and the second leg was played on 2 June 2015. The opponent was Holstein Kiel. The first leg finished in  a 0–0 draw. 1860 Munich won the second leg 2–1. Daniel Adlung and Kai Bülow scored for 1860 Munich. Rafael Kazior scored for Holstein Kiel. With the win, 1860 Munich retained their status as a second division club.

Competitive results

Bundesliga

League

Results summary

Results

Relegation playoff

DFB-Pokal

Squad statistics

Matches played and goals scored

|}

Bookings

References

TSV 1860 Munich seasons
Munich, 1860